Szolnoki may refer to:

Mária Szolnoki (born 1947), Hungarian fencer
Oliver Szolnoki (born 1997), Hungarian pool player
Roland Szolnoki (born 1992), Hungarian football player

See also
Szolnoki MÁV FC, Hungarian football club, from the city of Szolnok
Szolnoki Olajbányász, professional basketball team based in Szolnok, Hungary
2019–20 Szolnoki Vízilabda SC season, Szolnoki Dózsa's 99th year in existence as a water polo club
Szolnoki Vízilabda SC, professional water polo team based Szolnok, Hungary
Szolnoki Légierő SK, Hungarian football club from the town of Szolnok, Hungary
Szolnok